Jules Chauvet (1907-1989) was a wine négociant. He worked from La Chapelle-de-Guinchay in the Beaujolais.

Jules Chauvet was a winemaker and a taster. He also possessed the skills of a chemist, which he obtained at the school of chemistry at Lyon, then with Otto Warburg, with whom he maintained a long correspondence. He worked particularly on yeast, malolactic fermentation and carbonic maceration.

He also was a teacher in winemaking. As such he later inspired the movement of natural wines. He leaves books of quality, including The aroma of fine wine, the text of a lecture he delivered at the wine fair of Mâcon in 1950.

Own books
L'Esthétique du vin, Jean-Paul Rocher publisher, Paris, 104 p., 
Études scientifiques et autres communications (1949-1988), Jean-Paul Rocher publisher, Paris, 193 p., 
L'Arôme des vins fins, in Le Vin en question, an interview with Hans Ulrich Kesselring, Jean-Paul Rocher publisher, Paris, 1998, 108 p., 
Vins à la carte, tome 1, Jean-Paul Rocher publisher, Paris, 1998, 
La dégustation des vins, son mécanisme et ses lois in Évelyne Léard-Viboux & Lucien Chauvet, Jules Chauvet, naturellement..., Jean-Paul Rocher publisher, Paris, 2006, 113 p.,

Bibliography
 Sébastien Lapaque, Chez Marcel Lapierre, Stock, collection Écrivins, Paris, 2004, 
J.-Camille Goy, Jules Chauvet. L'homme du vin perdu, Jean-Paul Rocher publisher, coll. « Magenta », Paris, 2002, 110 p., 
Jacques Néauport, Jules Chauvet ou le talent du vin, Jean-Paul Rocher publisher, Paris, 1997, 332 p.,

See also
List of wine personalities

References

French winemakers
1907 births
1989 deaths